Fiona Yuen Choi Wan (born 20 January 1976 in Cologne) is a German-born Hong Kong model and actress.

Yuen went to Hong Kong and took part in the 1996 Miss Hong Kong Pageant, where she was second runner-up and won the Miss International Goodwill award. She speaks German, French, English, Mandarin, Cantonese and Hakka fluently. In 2010, it was announced that she would leave the entertainment and move to Vancouver to start a new life.
She is currently under ATV Home, a local Hong Kong television station, as a host and program presenter.

Television series

A Kindred Spirit (1995)
Rural Hero (1998)
The Legend Of Lady Yang (2000)
A Matter of Customs (2000)
Crimson Sabre (2000)
Healing Hands II (2000)
Gods of Honour (2001)
At Point Blank (2001)
Lofty Waters Verdant Bow (2002)
The 'W' Files (2003)
The Vigilante in the Mask (2003)
Fight for Love (2004)
Love and Again (2004)
Split Second (2004)
Placebo Cure(2004)
Always Ready (2005)
Just Love (2005)
Guts of Man (2005)
Face to Fate (2006)
ICAC Investigators 2007
The Ultimate Crime Fighter (2007)
Last One Standing (2008)
The Winter Melon Tale (2009)
Man in Charge (2009)

External links
 

|-
! colspan="3" style="background: #DAA520;" | Miss Hong Kong

1976 births
German emigrants to Hong Kong
Living people
20th-century Hong Kong actresses
21st-century Hong Kong actresses
Hong Kong television presenters
Hong Kong women television presenters
Actors from Cologne
TVB actors
German television actresses
German women television presenters
German people of Chinese descent